Mohammed Farouk Bhamji (Janeman) (17 February  1953 – 27 September 2013)  was a Fijian football player and coach.

Janeman was a star soccer player representing the premier Fiji Football Association team of Ba in the 1970s. After his retirement as a player, he took up coaching, and led a number of district and national sides. In the 2006 elections Janeman contested the Ba West Indian Communal Constituency as a National Federation Party candidate and obtained only 10.51% of the votes.

Achievement as a soccer player 
 He was the captain of the Ba team that defeated Rewa in the 1976 Interdistrict Competition.
 He scored the lone goal when Ba defeated Suva in the 1977 Interdistrict Competition.
 He scored the decisive goal when Ba defeated Labasa in the 1978 Interdistrict Competition.
 Member of Ba soccer team's 1977 tour of New Zealand. played for Fiji national team for 11 years.

Soccer teams coached by Janeman 
 Coach of national under fifteen team that took part in the Northern Ireland Milk Cup from 18 to 24 July 2004 in Belfast.
 Coach of the Fiji Nation U-12 Team that took part in the Danone Cup in France in 2008 and placed 24th out of 40 countries.  The team's name was Flying Arrow S.C. U-12 team as a big part of the support for the team came from the Flying Arrow Sports Club in Surrey, B.C., Canada.
 Coach of Fiji team to Oceania Football Confederation Under 17 Championship in Tahiti from 20 to 24 March 2007.
 Assistant coach of Fiji national teams tour of the United States from 1 to 19 April 2007.
  He is the FIJI Football Association development manager. he is ba teams head coach

References 

Fijian Muslims
Labasa F.C. players
National Federation Party politicians
Ba F.C. players
Rewa F.C. players
2013 deaths
Politicians from Ba Province
1953 births
Fijian football managers
Association footballers not categorized by position
Fijian footballers